Ioan Suciu (30 November 1933 – 10 April 2018) was a Romanian international footballer who played as a midfielder.

International career
Suciu played two friendly games for Romania, making his debut in 1955 when coach Gheorghe Popescu I used him as a starter in a match against Poland which ended 2–2. His second game was a 2–0 loss against Sweden.

Honours
Universitatea Cluj
Divizia B: 1957–58
Cupa României: 1964–65

References

External links

1933 births
2018 deaths
Romanian footballers
Romania international footballers
Association football midfielders
CFR Cluj players
FC Universitatea Cluj players
Liga I players
Liga II players